Dobele Castle is a castle in the town of Dobele in the historical region of Zemgale, Latvia. The Livonian order built the castle on the west bank of the Berze river in 1335, on the site of an old hillfort.

History 
The area surrounding Dobele castle was inhabited by Semigallians before and during the Livonian crusade. A hillfort provided protection for the settlement acting as the administrative center of Dobele county. It was first mentioned by written sources in 1254.

During the Livonian crusade battles were fought at the hillfort. It endured six sieges by the Livonian order, but crusaders never managed to capture the fort. In 1279 a crusader army from Kuldīga reinforced by allied Curonians attacked the Semigallian fort but was unable to conquer it. In the winter of 1280–81 a Livonian army commanded by master Konrad von Feuchtwangen unsuccessfully attacked Dobele fort. During the winter of 1288–89 a large crusader army, including allied estonians and latgalians under command of master Kuno von Hazzingenstein, attacked Dobele. They pillaged and burned the town, but were unable to take the fört. In 1289, after the crusaders had adopted a scorched earth policy and famine had struck the region, the remaining Semigallians burned their fort to the ground and migrated to Lithuania. The Dobele hillfort was one of the last Semigallian fortresses in the territory of Latvia.

Decades later, the Livonian order decided to fortify the site once again. A stone castle was constructed in the years 1335–1347. A small settlement populated by craftsmen and merchants soon developed around the castle. Until 1562 castle was a seat of the Dobele komtur. In the 16th and 17th centuries several regional assemblies (landtage) were held at the castle. In 1621 and 1625 the castle was briefly occupied by Swedish troops under king Gustav II Adolf. From 1643 until 1649 the castle was the residence of Elisabeth Magdalena, widow of the Duke of Courland. She lived there together with her foster son, the future duke Jacob. During the Polish-Swedish wars the castle was occupied by swedes again in 1658. After the war it was partly restored by duke Jacob Kettler. During the Great Northern War the castle was occupied by swedes once more in 1701. The king of Sweden Charles XII stayed in the castle for six days. During the war Dobele castle was devastated and was not restored. It was abandoned in 1736 and fell gradually into ruin.

In 1915 German emperor Wilhelm II visited the foothill by the castle ruins during an inspection of units of the German Imperial Army.

See also
 List of castles in Latvia

References

External links
 

Dobele
Castles in Latvia
Castles of the Livonian Order